Summerside-Wilmot is a provincial electoral district for the Legislative Assembly of Prince Edward Island, Canada. It was formerly named Wilmot-Summerside from 1996 to 2007.

Members
The riding has elected the following Members of the Legislative Assembly:

Election results

Summerside-Wilmot, 2007–present

2016 electoral reform plebiscite results

Wilmot-Summerside, 1996–2007

References

 Summerside-Wilmot information

Prince Edward Island provincial electoral districts
Politics of Summerside, Prince Edward Island